Sir David Treharne Llewellyn (17 January 1916 – 9 August 1992), was a British Conservative politician and junior minister.

Llewellyn was the third son of the Welsh industrialist Sir David Llewellyn, 1st Baronet. Sir Rhys and Sir Harry Llewellyn were his elder brothers. He sat as Member of Parliament for Cardiff North from 1950 to 1959 and served under Winston Churchill as Under-Secretary of State for the Home Department from 1951 to 1952. He was created a Knight Bachelor, for political and public services, in the  1960 New Year Honours List.

Llewellyn married Joan Anne Williams  (1916–2013), who was head of the wartime Cabinet Office cypher office. They had two sons and one daughter.

Notes

References 

Kidd, Charles, Williamson, David (editors). Debrett's Peerage and Baronetage (1990 edition). New York: St Martin's Press, 1990,

See also
Llewellyn Baronets of Bwlffa

1916 births
1992 deaths
Conservative Party (UK) MPs for Welsh constituencies
Members of the Parliament of the United Kingdom for Cardiff constituencies
Ministers in the third Churchill government, 1951–1955
UK MPs 1950–1951
UK MPs 1951–1955
UK MPs 1955–1959
Younger sons of baronets